Stephen Gilham (born 2 September 1984) is a former professional Australian rules footballer who played for the Port Adelaide Football Club, Hawthorn Football Club and Greater Western Sydney Giants in the Australian Football League (AFL). He now works as a Partnerships Manager with Swisse.

Gilham's junior career was distinguished, playing for Oakleigh Chargers in the TAC Cup and in 2002 he was chosen to captain the Victoria Metro under 18 side in the national carnival. A skinny defender, Gilham was taken by Port Adelaide with its second pick (pick 16 overall) in the 2002 AFL Draft.

AFL career

Port Adelaide 

Gilham's three seasons at Port Adelaide were hampered by groin and shoulder injuries, together with difficulty gaining the strength to succeed as a key defender in the AFL.  Gilham only managed one senior game during his time in South Australia, in 2005 as result of an injury and illness to two other players. He was delisted at the end of the season.
Gilham's return to Victoria (and the AFL) came courtesy of Hawthorn, who selected him with pick 34 in the 2006 Rookie Draft.

Hawthorn 

Gilham spent most of 2006 playing for Hawthorn's VFL affiliate team, Box Hill, before eventually earning an opportunity in the senior side in the round 19 match against Carlton. He remained in the side for the remainder of the season, and impressed observers with his composure under pressure.

In recognition of his improvement in both game play and muscle mass, Gilham was promoted to Hawthorn's senior list for season 2007.
During the 2007 season, Gilham consolidated a role in the senior side. He played every match for the year, and was effective on a wide range of opponents in defence. His solid form continued in 2008, culminating with a key role in the 2008 AFL Grand Final. After fellow key defender Trent Croad was forced from the field with a broken foot early in the second quarter, Gilham's presence provided vital stability on the last line, helping the team to claim the 2008 AFL premiership.

Gilham injured his left knee when he hyperextended in a NAB Cup quarter-final against Carlton more in 2009 pre-season cup.

In round eight of the 2011 season whilst playing against St Kilda, Gilham ruptured the anterior cruciate ligament in his right knee and then missed the rest of the season

Greater Western Sydney 

Gilham was traded to the Greater Western Sydney Giants on 26 October 2012.

On 26 August 2014, Gilham announced his retirement from the AFL, effective at the end of the season.

Statistics

|- style=background:#EAEAEA
| 2003 ||  || 32
| 0 || — || — || — || — || — || — || — || — || — || — || — || — || — || — || —
|-
| 2004 ||  || 32
| 0 || — || — || — || — || — || — || — || — || — || — || — || — || — || — || —
|- style=background:#EAEAEA
| 2005 ||  || 32
| 1 || 0 || 0 || 1 || 0 || 1 || 0 || 0 || 0.0 || 0.0 || 1.0 || 0.0 || 1.0 || 0.0 || 0.0 || 0
|-
| 2006 ||  || 42
| 4 || 0 || 0 || 26 || 36 || 62 || 23 || 4 || 0.0 || 0.0 || 6.5 || 9.0 || 15.5 || 5.8 || 1.0 || 0
|- style=background:#EAEAEA
| 2007 ||  || 27
| 24 || 1 || 0 || 176 || 134 || 310 || 150 || 33 || 0.0 || 0.0 || 7.3 || 5.6 || 12.9 || 6.3 || 1.4 || 0
|-
| bgcolor=F0E68C | 2008# ||  || 27
| 24 || 1 || 0 || 163 || 159 || 322 || 133 || 22 || 0.0 || 0.0 || 6.8 || 6.6 || 13.4 || 5.5 || 0.9 || 0
|- style=background:#EAEAEA
| 2009 ||  || 27
| 10 || 0 || 0 || 54 || 93 || 147 || 40 || 22 || 0.0 || 0.0 || 5.4 || 9.3 || 14.7 || 4.0 || 2.2 || 0
|-
| 2010 ||  || 27
| 23 || 1 || 1 || 150 || 131 || 281 || 99 || 37 || 0.0 || 0.0 || 6.5 || 5.7 || 12.2 || 4.3 || 1.6 || 0
|- style=background:#EAEAEA
| 2011 ||  || 27
| 7 || 0 || 0 || 52 || 32 || 84 || 27 || 7 || 0.0 || 0.0 || 7.4 || 4.6 || 12.0 || 3.9 || 1.0 || 0
|-
| 2012 ||  || 27
| 6 || 1 || 0 || 38 || 35 || 73 || 23 || 7 || 0.2 || 0.0 || 6.3 || 5.8 || 12.2 || 3.8 || 1.2 || 0
|- style=background:#EAEAEA
| 2013 ||  || 38
| 14 || 0 || 0 || 140 || 73 || 213 || 81 || 19 || 0.0 || 0.0 || 10.0 || 5.2 || 15.2 || 5.8 || 1.4 || 0
|-
| 2014 ||  || 38
| 1 || 0 || 0 || 4 || 5 || 9 || 4 || 1 || 0.0 || 0.0 || 4.0 || 5.0 || 9.0 || 4.0 || 1.0 || 0
|- class="sortbottom"
! colspan=3| Career
! 114 !! 4 !! 1 !! 804 !! 698 !! 1502 !! 580 !! 152 !! 0.0 !! 0.0 !! 7.1 !! 6.1 !! 13.2 !! 5.1 !! 1.3 !! 0
|}

Honours and achievements
Team
 AFL premiership player: 2008
 Minor premiership: 2012

Individual
 Under 18 All-Australian team: 2002

References

External links

Hawthorn Football Club players
Port Adelaide Football Club players
Hawthorn Football Club Premiership players
Port Adelaide Football Club players (all competitions)
Box Hill Football Club players
1984 births
Living people
Australian rules footballers from Victoria (Australia)
Oakleigh Chargers players
Greater Western Sydney Giants players
One-time VFL/AFL Premiership players